Hepworth may refer to:

Places 
 Hepworth, Suffolk
 Hepworth, West Yorkshire (in Kirklees, near Huddersfield)
 Hepworth, Ontario
 Hepworth Gallery (art gallery in Wakefield)

People 
 Dame Barbara Hepworth (1903–1975), British sculptor and artist
 Cecil Hepworth (1874–1953), British film director, producer and scriptwriter
 David Hepworth (born 1950), British music journalist
 David Hepworth (racing driver) British racing car driver
 Dorothy Hepworth (1898–1978), British painter and associate of Patricia Preece
 John Hepworth (born 1944), Australian Archbishop and Primate of the Traditional Anglican Communion
 John Hepworth (writer) (1921–1995), Australian left-wing author and journalist
 Joseph Hepworth (tailor) (1834–1911), founder Joseph Hepworth & Son, clothing manufacturers, now Next plc.
 Joseph Hepworth (c. 1876–1945), British Conservative Party politician
 Philip Hepworth (1888–1963), British architect
 Sally Hepworth (born 1980), Australian writer of The Secrets of Midwives
 Tom Stanley Hepworth (1916–1985), Australian teacher, author, and editor.